

A
Aminah Assilmi - former Southern Baptist preacher.
Kareem Abdul-Jabbar – retired basketball player & the NBA's all-time leading scorer
Mahmoud Abdul-Rauf – American former professional basketball player
Tariq Abdul-Wahad – French basketball coach and former player
Eric Abidal – French former professional footballer; played mainly for Lyon and Barcelona
Ivan Aguéli - Swedish Sufi, Painter & Writer
Abdul-Karim al-Jabbar – former NFL player
Mahershala Ali – American actor and first Muslim actor to win an Oscar

 Muhammad Ali (born Cassius Marcellus Clay, Jr., 1942–2016) – converted from Baptist to The Nation of Islam to Sunni Islam;  American professional boxer (three-time world heavyweight champion), philanthropist and social activist
 Rowland Allanson-Winn, 5th Baron Headley – British soldier and peer

B
Kristiane Backer - a German television presenter, television journalist and author residing in London
Maurice Bucaille - French family physician of King Faisal.
A. George Baker – American Protestant clergyman and medical doctor who converted to Islam.
 Abdullah Beg of Kartli – Georgian convert to Islam; served as a viceroy of Kartli for the Iranian Shah, Nadir in 1737;  claimant to the kingship of Kartli
Mohammed Knut Bernstrom - Swedish ambassador to Venezuela (1963-1969), Spain (1973-1976) and Morocco (1976-1983)
 Danny Blum – German footballer
 Ibrahim Bey – Egyptian Mamluk of Georgian Christian origins
 Józef Bem – Polish and Hungarian general; historically defined as a national hero within Poland and Hungary; escaped to the Ottoman Empire where he converted to Islam and took up the name Murad Pasha
 Omar Bongo – Gabonese, Ex-President of Gabon
 Wojciech Bobowski – raised Protestant; Polish musician; translator of the Bible into Ottoman Turkish
R. V. C. Bodley - British Army officer, writer and journalist
Willie Brigitte – convicted criminal, who was deported from Australia in 2003
Dolores "LaLa" Brooks - American musician

C
 Torquato Cardilli - Italian ambassador
André Carson - American politician serving as the U.S. representative for Indiana's 7th congressional district since 2008
Count Cassius – Visigothic aristocrat who founded the Banu Qasi dynasty of Muwallad rulers
Dave Chappelle - comedian and television star
 Chrisye –Chinese Indonesian singer; changed his name to Chrismansyah Rahadi from Christian Rahadi
 Emilia Contessa – Indonesian actress, singer and politician (from Islam to Christianity back to Islam; known as Nur Indah Cintra Sukma Munsyi)
 Zainab Cobbold – first Muslim woman born in Britain to perform the Hajj pilgrimage
Robert D. Crane – former adviser to President Richard Nixon, and is former Deputy Director (for Planning) of the U.S. National Security Council

D
Mujahid Dokubo-Asari – founder and leader of the Niger Delta People's Volunteer Force

E
Abdullah el-Faisal – Muslim cleric who preached in the United Kingdom until he was convicted of stirring up racial hatred and urging his followers to murder Jews, Hindus, Christians, and Americans
 Wadih el-Hage – former Al-Qaeda member who was convicted for his part in the 1998 United States embassy bombings
 Keith Ellison – American, Representative from Minnesota's 5th congressional district, first Muslim to be elected to the United States Congress, converted from Catholicism
 Elpidius – Byzantine aristocrat and governor of Sicily
 Erekle I of Kakheti – Georgian convert to Islam who ruled the kingdoms of Kakheti and Kartli
 Yusuf Estes – former preacher and federal prison chaplain, converted from Protestantism
 Gazi Evrenos – Byzantine convert to Islam

F
 Jaime Fletcher - American film maker and founder of IslamInSpanish .
Shah Shahidullah Faridi – writer of German descent born to a Christian family
 Firouz – Armenian Christian convert to Islam who served as a spy for Bohemund during the Siege of Antioch
 Myriam François, previously François-Cerrah – journalist who converted from Roman Catholicism in 2003
 Franck Ribéry - Soccer player of French national soccer team converted to Islam after learning about Islam from his Algerian friend who he later married. In respect to his conversion Bayern Munich gave him a small place to worship during his football career.

G
 Roger Garaudy – French philosopher and writer 
Jennifer Grout - American singer of Arabic music.
 Ghazan – seventh ruler of the Ilkhanate division of the Mongol Empire
 Khalid Gonçalves – Portuguese American actor and musician (born Paul Pires Gonçalves), converted from Catholicism
 Cristian Gonzáles – Uruguayan-born Indonesian footballer
 Abdur Raheem Green – presenter on Peace TV and the chairman of iERA, the Islamic Education & Research Academy. 
 Charles Greenlee – American jazz trombonist
René Guénon - French metaphysician and founder of the Traditionalist School of metaphysics

H
 
 Sir Archibald Hamilton, 5th Baronet – distinguished British convert to Islam
 Omar Hammami – American-born member of the Somali Islamist paramilitary group al-Shabaab; known as Abu Mansoor Al-Amriki
 Hatice Refia Hanım – mother of Tevfik Fikret
 Joel Hayward – British scholar, author and poet
 Muhammad Robert Heft – Canadian activist and writer
 Murad Wilfred Hofmann – NATO official, converted from Catholicism
 Knud Holmboe – Danish journalist and explorer who converted from Catholicism
Bernard Hopkins - American former professional boxer

I
Kyrie Irving - American Basketball player
 Silma Ihram - Australian pioneer of Muslim education in the West, founder and former school Principal of the 'Noor Al Houda Islamic College', campaigner for racial tolerance
Yusuf Islam – musician born as Steven Demetre Georgiou and formerly known as Cat Stevens.

J
Ibn Jazla – 11th-century physician and Christian convert who later wrote to refute doctrines of Christianity
 Sarah Joseph – commentator on women's issues and founder of emel magazine, converted from Catholicism

K
 Abdul Kadir – former Guyanese politician, convicted of the 2007 John F. Kennedy International Airport attack plot
 David Benjamin Keldani – former Catholic priest who converted to Islam and changed his name to Abd ul-Aḥad Dāwūd
 Nuh Ha Mim Keller – Islamic scholar who converted from Catholicism to agnosticism to Sunni Islam
Rebeka Koha -  Latvian weightlifter 2 time junior world champion and two time European champion.
 Allahverdi Khan – general and statesman of Georgian origin who was Christian
 Mirza Malkam Khan – Iranian Armenian proponent of Freemasonry who was active during the period leading up to the Iranian Constitutional Revolution
 John Tzelepes Komnenos – allied himself with the Seljuks against his uncle; Greek convert

L
 Colleen LaRose – identifies herself as "Jihad Jane";  American citizen charged with terrorism-related crimes
 Leo of Tripoli – Byzantine Greek renegade who freed 4000 Muslim prisoners while attacking the Byzantine city of Thessalonica
 Samantha Lewthwaite  – also known as Sherafiyah Lewthwaite or the White Widow, one of the United Kingdom's most wanted terrorism suspects
 Germaine Lindsay – one of the suicide terrorists in the 7 July 2005 London bombings in which 52 people were murdered
 John Walker Lindh – American insurgent, known as the "American Taliban"; converted from Catholicism
Martin Lings - British Biographer, Scholar, Traditionalist and Writer; he is famous for having written the best biography of the Prophet Muhammad in the English language.
 Alexander Litvinenko – former FSB officer; converted to Islam on his deathbed
 Fernão Lopes – 16th-century Portuguese soldier; tortured and disfigured by Christians for siding with Muslims
 Badr al-Din Lu'lu' – Armenian convert to Islam and successor to the Zangid rulers of Mosul
 Vincenzo Luvineri – American rapper and the lyricist behind the Philadelphia underground hip-hop group Jedi Mind Tricks; converted from Catholicism

M

 Daniel Maldonado – American Islamist convicted in the United States on charges of training with al-Qaida in East Africa; raised Catholic
 Ingrid Mattson – Canadian scholar and current president of the Islamic Society of North America (2006); converted from Catholicism
Bruno Metsu – French footballer and football manager
 Köse Mihal – Byzantine renegade; accompanied Osman al-Ghazi in his ascent to power and converted to Islam
 Mleh, Prince of Armenia – Armenian convert to Islam from the Armenian Apostolic Church;  eighth lord of Armenian Cilicia
 Preacher Moss – American comedian and comedy writer who converted from Baptist Christianity;
 John Allen Muhammad – convicted of perpetrating the Beltway sniper attacks with his partner, Lee Boyd Malvo, in which 17 people were murdered
Matthew Saad Muhammad – American professional boxer who was the WBC Light Heavyweight Champion of the World for two-and-a-half years
Peter Murphy –  English singer, songwriter, and musician
 Ibrahim Muteferrika (original name not known) – from Unitarian Christianity, an early example of a Muslim publisher and printer
David Myatt - British Philosopher, Poet, Writer and a former Neo-Nazi; he later apostatised.

N
 Adam Neuser – German Lutheran pastor who criticized the doctrine of the trinity and was consequently imprisoned
 Tech N9ne – American rapper born to a Christian mother who converted to Islam during adulthood

O
 Sir David Ochterlony, 1st Baronet - British American East India Company officer and Mughal courtier
Öljaitü – ruler of the Ilkhanate dynasty
 Occhiali – Italian convert
 Sinéad O'Connor (Shuhada' Davitt) – Irish singer-songwriter; a former excommunicated Roman Catholic before becoming a Nondenominational Trinitarian Christian for several years and later [Sunni] Islam due of theological reasons

P

 José Padilla – also known as Abdullah al-Muhajir or Muhajir Abdullah; US citizen from Brooklyn, New York; convicted in federal court of aiding terrorists; also known as "the dirty bomber"
Wayne Parnell – South African cricketer
Abdul Wahid Pedersen - Danish Imam.
Hersekzade Ahmed Pasha – born to a Christian Croatian
Sokollu Mehmed Pasha (1506–1578) – Ottoman statesman; born Orthodox, converted through devşirme
 Pargalı Ibrahim Pasha – Ottoman Grand Vizier
 Koca Yusuf Pasha – Georgian Grand Vizier of the Ottoman Empire who also served as the governor of Peloponnese
 Damat Hasan Pasha – Ottoman Grand Vizier He converted to Islam early on at the Enderun School through the Devşirme Christian child tax system.
 Moralı Enişte Hasan Pasha – Greek Ottoman Grand Vizier
 Judar Pasha – conqueror of the Songhai Empire
 Omar Pasha (1806–1871) – Ottoman general, born Orthodox
 Raghib Pasha – Greek Ottoman politician who served as Prime Minister of Egypt; converted to Islam from Christianity
 Zağanos Pasha – one of the prominent military commanders of Mehmet II (Mehmet the Conqueror) and a lala, at once an advisor, mentor, tutor, councillor, protector, for the sultan
Marmaduke Pickthall – English Islamic scholar and translator of the Quran
Bilal Philips - Canadian Muslim teacher, speaker, author, founder and chancellor of the Islamic Online University

Q
Abdullah Quilliam – English convert from Christianity to Islam, noted for founding England's first mosque and Islamic centre.

R
 Ilie II Rareş – prince of Moldavia
 Murat Reis or Jan Janszoon – Dutch Barbary pirate who was an admiral for the Republic of Salé; converted from Christianity; became a very active Muslim missionary who tried to convert Christian slaves
 Yvonne Ridley – British journalist, from Anglicanism; converted after being kidnapped and released by the Taliban
Khadijah Rivera - Puerto Rican Muslim convert from Roman Catholicism, founder of PIEDAD
 Robert of St. Albans – English templar knight who converted to Islam from Christianity in 1185 and led an army for Saladin against the Crusaders in Jerusalem

S
Stephen Jackson  - American Professional Basketball player who played for the NBA
Salman the Persian – convert from Christianity; previously Zoroastrian
 Ahmed Santos – Filipino, fugitive, founder of the Rajah Solaiman Movement; converted from Catholicism
Ratna Sarumpaet – Indonesian stagewright, director, and actress
Frithjof Schuon - Swiss metaphysician, poet, painter and Traditionalist
 Betty Shabazz – wife of Malcolm X; former Methodist
Zaid Shakir - Muslim American scholar and co-founder of Zaytuna College in Berkeley, California
Mario Scialoja -  Italian ambassador to Saudi Arabia from 1994 to 1996
Dolly Shahine (born 2 July 1980) – Lebanese former singer, actress, and fashion designer.
 Ahmad Faris Shidyaq – Lebanese scholar, writer and journalist; Maronite convert to Islam
 Mimar Sinan – Ottoman architect; converted to Islam and trained as an officer of the Janissary corps
Anthony Small – retired professional boxer and Islamic political activist
Henry Stanley, 3rd Baron Stanley of Alderley and 2nd Baron Eddisbury - British Historian and Translator
Robert Stanley - British grocer, tea trader and mayor of Stalybridge
 Daniel Streich – Swiss military instructor, community council member and a former member of Swiss People's Party 
 Kösem Sultan – born Anastasia, the daughter of an Orthodox priest, and later enslaved by Ottomans and sent to Istanbul, where  she became one of the most powerful and influential women in the Ottoman Empire
 Handan Sultan – mother of Ottoman sultan Ahmed I

T
 Abu Tammam – 9th-century Arab poet born to Christian parents
 Andrew Tate  - Retired British kickboxer, converted to Islam in October 2022.
 Tekuder – Mongol leader of the Ilkhan empire; formerly a Nestorian Christian
Joe Tex -  American singer and musician
 Joseph Thomas – Australian convert, acquitted of terrorism charges, placed under a control order under the Australian Anti-Terrorism Act 2005, currently pending retrial 
 Mihnea Turcitul – Prince (Voivode) of Walachia; converted from Eastern Orthodox Christianity
Mike Tyson –  American former professional boxer ;nicknamed "Iron Mike" and "Kid Dynamite" in his early career, and later known as "The Baddest Man on the Planet"

U
 Ismael Urbain – French journalist and interpreter

V
 Bryant Neal Vinas – participated in and supported al-Qaeda plots in Afghanistan and the US, and helped al-Qaeda plan a bomb attack on the LIRR
 Rudolf Carl von Slatin – Anglo-Austrian soldier and administrator in the Sudan; later reverted to Catholicism

W
Siraj Wahaj – former Baptist, African-American imam, noted for his efforts to eliminate Brooklyn's drug problems
 Alexander Russell Webb – former Presbyterian, American journalist, newspaper owner, and former Consul-General of the US in the Philippines
 Suhaib Webb – American Islamic activist and speaker
Dawud Wharnsby-Ali - Canadian singer/poet
 Danny Williams – British boxer
Sonny Bill Williams - New Zealand professional rugby league player, and former professional rugby union footballer and heavyweight boxer
 Timothy Winter – British Islamic scholar, lecturer in Islamic studies in the Faculty of Divinity at the University of Cambridge

X 

 Malcolm X - African-American Muslim minister, public speaker, and human rights activist. He converted from Christianity to The Nation of Islam and later to mainstream Sunni Islam
 Abel Xavier - Portuguese former professional footballer and manager

Y
Mohammad Yousuf - Former Pakistan Cricketer
 Khalid Yasin – Executive Director of the Islamic Teaching Institute, and a Shaykh currently residing in Australia
 Felixia Yeap – former model and Catholic of Chinese Malaysian heritage; converted to Islam in 2013
 James Yee – previously Lutheran and former US Army Muslim chaplain
Hamza Yusuf - American convert from Greek Orthodox to Sunni Islam; co-founder of the Zaytuna College

Z 

 Mohammed Zakariya - an American master of Arabic calligraphy, best known for his work on the popular Eid U.S. postage stamp

See also
 List of converts to Islam
 List of converts to Christianity from Islam

References 

Islam from Christianity